The 18th Annual Black Reel Awards ceremony, presented by the Foundation for the Augmentation of African-Americans in Film (FAAAF) and honoring the best films of 2017, took place on February 23, 2018, at 8:00 p.m. EST (5:00p.m. PST). During the ceremony, FAAAF presented the  Black Reel Awards in 21 categories.

The television film categories were moved and presented at the Black Reel Awards for Television. 

Get Out led all films with 12 nominations.

Winners and nominees
Winners are highlighted in bold.

References

Black Reel Awards
2017 film awards
2017 in American cinema
2017 awards in the United States